The first general election for the Northern Territory Legislative Assembly was held in the Northern Territory on Saturday 19 October 1974, and was won by the Country Liberal Party (CLP), formed a few months earlier from the merger of the territorial Country and Liberal parties.

The CLP won 49.01% of the vote, the Labor Party won 30.46% and independent candidates won 20.54%. The Country Liberals took 17 of the 19 assembly seats.  The other two were held by independents; Dawn Lawrie won the seat of Nightcliff, and Ron Withnall won the seat of Port Darwin. Despite finishing second in the vote count, Labor failed to win any seats, therefore being a landslide victory for the Country Liberals. Its support was spread out across the Territory, and was not concentrated in enough areas to translate into seats.

As the territory was still being prepared for self-government, Country Liberal Leader Goff Letts took the post of Majority Leader–equivalent to a state premier. Instead of a cabinet, a seven-person "executive" managed internal affairs.

Results

|}

Candidates

Successful candidates are highlighted in the relevant colour. Where there is possible confusion, an asterisk is used.

References

See also
First Letts Executive
Second Letts Executive
Third Letts Executive
Fourth Letts Executive

Elections in the Northern Territory
1974 elections in Australia
1970s in the Northern Territory
October 1974 events in Australia